Hanby is a hamlet in the South Kesteven district of Lincolnshire, England. The nearest large town is Grantham  to the north-west. Hanby  is part of the civil parish of Lenton, Keisby and Osgodby .

Lost settlement
The hamlet is the location of a lost village of Hanby: English Heritage Archive number TF03SW15; location TF02703159. Past observers have concluded that there were house platforms with building materials, including stone roof tiles, scattered around. Local finds include  a flint scraper, Anglo-Saxon pot sherds and medieval sherds. Aerial photographs show no shapes because the area has been ploughed over, but cropmarks show "two conjoined ditched enclosures . . . interpreted as possible crofts, with a small ditched enclosure". There was a ridge and furrow field to the north, but that was ploughed level too; however the farmer found Anglo-Saxon and medieval pottery in these fields. There is another lost settlement called Hanby at Welton le Marsh, or Hanby Hall, in the north of the county.

References

External links

 Aerial photograph of Hanby
 Old maps of Hanby: 1888, 1891 and 1905
 Modern map of Hanby

Villages in Lincolnshire
South Kesteven District
Deserted medieval villages in Lincolnshire
Archaeological sites in Lincolnshire